"Kiss of Life" is a song by English band Sade from their fourth studio album, Love Deluxe (1992). It was written by Sade Adu, Stuart Matthewman, Andrew Hale and Paul S. Denman, and produced by the band and Mike Pela.

The song was released as the album's third single on 26 April 1993. It reached number 44 on the UK Singles Chart and number 78 on the US Billboard Hot 100, while becoming Sade's seventh top-10 single on Billboards Hot R&B/Hip-Hop Songs chart, peaking at number 10. It also received significant airplay on smooth jazz radio stations.

Composition
"Kiss of Life" was originally published in the key of A Major in common time with a tempo of 97 beats per minute. Adu's vocals span from G#3 to C#5.

Critical reception
Justin Chadwick from Albumism called the song "wonderful", stating that it is one of "their most evocative and enduring love songs to date". Randy Clark from Cashbox described it as a "compelling love song in the same, easily identifiable soul-groove niche she carved out for herself" in 1985 with "Smooth Operator". The Daily Vault's Mark Millan said that it "however, leaves nothing to chance as it is the kind of simple but heartfelt love song that Sade is so good at producing." Dave Sholin from the Gavin Report noted that it "sounds like a natural follow-up" to "No Ordinary Love". 

Alan Jones from Music Week deemed it "one of her most expressive pieces, with fluted notes and the odd wail all melding nicely in a warm, summery setting." He added, "If she were a new artist, she'd attract immediate and overwhelming attention." James Hamilton from the magazine's RM Dance Update described it as "Suzanne Vega-ish". Leesa Daniels from Smash Hits gave it three out of five, writing, "You know exactly what you're going to get; the slow beat, saxophone solo, bongo drums and her husky vocals. Even so, this is perfect background music for watching the sun go down with the person you really want to snog!" Frank Guan of Vulture commented, "Her love songs typically split between the ones where love is flawless and the ones where love is threatened, and this falls clearly in the former category. A rich funk bassline laced with jazz piano provides the perfect backdrop for this ode to the best of feelings."

Music video
The music video for "Kiss of Life" was directed by Albert Watson. It was filmed in and around Miami, Florida. Included in the video are shots of the Washington Park Hotel in South Beach.

Track listings

7-inch single
A. "Kiss of Life" – 4:10
B. "Room 55" – 4:20

12-inch single
A. "Kiss of Life" – 4:10
B1. "Room 55" – 4:20
B2. "Kiss of Life" (album version) – 5:48

UK CD single
"Kiss of Life" – 4:10
"Room 55" – 4:20
"Kiss of Life" (album version) – 5:48

UK and Australian CD single (cardboard sleeve) / Japanese mini CD single / US cassette single
"Kiss of Life" – 4:10
"Room 55" – 4:20

Charts

Weekly charts

Year-end charts

Cover versions
 Guitarist Ken Navarro covered the song in the closing track from Navarro's studio album Smooth Sensation (1997).
 In 2005, trumpeter Rick Braun covered the song from the album Yours Truly.
 The song was sampled in the MF Doom song "Doomsday" from his debut album Operation: Doomsday.
 Japanese hip hop producer Nujabes produced a cover of the song featuring Giovanca and Benny Sings on the 2009 compilation album Mellow Beats, Friends & Lovers.
 Japanese musician Friday Night Plans released a cover of the song as a single in 2020.

References

Songs about kissing
1990s ballads
1992 songs
1993 singles
Epic Records singles
Music videos directed by Sophie Muller
Sade (band) songs
Song recordings produced by Mike Pela
Songs written by Sade (singer)
Songs written by Stuart Matthewman